"I Love You Came Too Late" is a song by Joey McIntyre, released as the second single from his debut album, Stay the Same.

Track listing
"I Love You Came Too Late"
"Stay the Same (Tony Moran Radio Remix)"

Music video
The video features McIntyre in a diner having flashbacks with his ex-girlfriend.  He feels depressed during the video and sees his ex with a new boyfriend and looks away.  When he leaves, McIntyre then hides from her inside the kitchen while trying to tell her he loves her.  After telling her, McIntyre enlightens everyone with some dance.  As he dances with her, he notices a ring (engagement or marriage) and feels depressed again.  During the video, the girl does not seem to be shocked that she saw McIntyre at all.

Charts

References

External links

1999 singles
Songs written by Eric Foster White
1999 songs